Reno County (standard abbreviation: RN) is a county located in the U.S. state of Kansas. As of the 2020 census, the population was 61,898. The largest city and county seat is Hutchinson.

History

Early history

For many millennia, the Great Plains of North America was inhabited by nomadic Native Americans.  From the 16th century to 18th century, the Kingdom of France claimed ownership of large parts of North America.  In 1762, after the French and Indian War, France secretly ceded New France to Spain, per the Treaty of Fontainebleau.

19th century
In 1802, Spain returned most of the land to France, but keeping title to about 7,500 square miles.  In 1803, most of the land for modern day Kansas was acquired by the United States from France as part of the 828,000 square mile Louisiana Purchase for 2.83 cents per acre.

In 1854, the Kansas Territory was organized, then in 1861 Kansas became the 34th U.S. state.  

In 1867, Reno County was established, named for General Jesse L. Reno.

In 1887, the Chicago, Kansas and Nebraska Railway extended its main line from Herington to Pratt.  This main line connected Herington, Ramona, Tampa, Durham, Waldeck, Canton, Galva, McPherson, Groveland, Inman, Medora, Hutchinson, Whiteside, Partridge, Arlington,  Langdon, Turon, Preston, Natrona, Pratt.  In 1888, this main line was extended to Liberal.  Later, this line was extended to Tucumcari, New Mexico and El Paso, Texas.  This line is called the "Golden State Limited".

Geography
It is the third-largest county by area in Kansas.

Adjacent counties
 Rice County (north)
 McPherson County (northeast)
 Harvey County (east)
 Sedgwick County (southeast)
 Kingman County (south)
 Pratt County (southwest)
 Stafford County (west)

National protected area
 Quivira National Wildlife Refuge (part)

Demographics

The Hutchinson Micropolitan Statistical Area includes all of Reno County.

As of the census of 2000, there were 64,790 people, 25,498 households, and 17,313 families residing in the county.  The population density was 52 people per square mile (20/km2).  There were 27,625 housing units at an average density of 22 per square mile (8/km2).  The racial makeup of the county was 91.56% White, 2.88% Black or African American, 0.58% Native American, 0.45% Asian, 0.04% Pacific Islander, 2.69% from other races, and 1.81% from two or more races.  5.65% of the population were Hispanic or Latino of any race.

There were 25,498 households, out of which 30.30% had children under the age of 18 living with them, 55.90% were married couples living together, 8.70% had a female householder with no husband present, and 32.10% were non-families. 27.90% of all households were made up of individuals, and 12.10% had someone living alone who was 65 years of age or older.  The average household size was 2.41 and the average family size was 2.94.

In the county, the population was spread out, with 24.50% under the age of 18, 9.30% from 18 to 24, 26.90% from 25 to 44, 22.90% from 45 to 64, and 16.40% who were 65 years of age or older.  The median age was 38 years. For every 100 females there were 100.90 males.  For every 100 females age 18 and over, there were 99.00 males.

The median income for a household in the county was $35,510, and the median income for a family was $42,643. Males had a median income of $31,495 versus $21,329 for females. The per capita income for the county was $18,520.  About 8.10% of families and 10.90% of the population were below the poverty line, including 13.90% of those under age 18 and 8.50% of those age 65 or over.

Government
Reno County is strongly Republican. The last time a Democratic candidate won the county was in 1976 when Jimmy Carter did so. However, 1988 was somewhat close as Michael Dukakis lost the county by only 5 percentage points due to a persistent drought and farm crisis.

Presidential elections

Laws
Reno County was a prohibition, or "dry", county until the Kansas Constitution was amended in 1986 and voters approved the sale of alcoholic liquor by the individual drink with a 30 percent food sales requirement. The food sales requirement was removed with voter approval in 2004.

Education

Colleges
 Hutchinson Community College

Unified school districts
 Hutchinson USD 308
 Nickerson-South Hutchinson USD 309
 Fairfield USD 310
 Pretty Prairie USD 311
 Haven USD 312
 Buhler USD 313

Private schools
There are three private schools in Hutchinson:
 Central Christian School (K-12)
 Trinity Catholic High School (7-12)
 Holy Cross Catholic school (PreK-6)

Communities

Cities

 Abbyville
 Arlington
 Buhler
 Haven
 Hutchinson
 Langdon
 Nickerson
 Partridge
 Plevna
 Pretty Prairie
 South Hutchinson
 Sylvia
 The Highlands
 Turon
 Willowbrook

Unincorporated communities
† means a Census-Designated Place (CDP) by the United States Census Bureau.
 Castleton
 Darlow
 Huntsville
 Lerado
 Medora
 St. Joe
 Yaggy
 Yoder†

Ghost towns
 Kent

Townships
Reno County is divided into thirty-one townships.  The cities of Hutchinson and Nickerson are considered governmentally independent and are excluded from the census figures for the townships.  In the following table, the population center is the largest city (or cities) included in that township's population total, if it is of a significant size.

See also
 National Register of Historic Places listings in Reno County, Kansas
 Reno County Area Transit, known as Rcat, provides public transportation for the citizens of the county.

References

Notes

Further reading

 History of Reno County, Kansas : Its People, Industries, and Institutions; 2 Volumes; Sheridan Ploughe; Bowen and Company; 445 / 959 pages; 1917. (Volume1 - Download 19MB PDF eBook), (Volume2 - Download 32MB PDF eBook)
 Standard Atlas of Reno County, Kansas; Geo. A. Ogle & Co; 110 pages; 1918.
 Plat Book of Reno County, Kansas; Hutchinson Blue Print Co; 61 pages; 1912.
 Plat Book of Reno County, Kansas; North West Publishing Co; 77 pages; 1902.

External links

County
 
 Reno County - Directory of Public Officials
Other
 Reno County Museum
Maps
 Reno County Maps: Current, Historic, KDOT
 Kansas Highway Maps: Current, Historic, KDOT
 Kansas railroad maps: Current, 1996, 1915, KDOT and Kansas Historical Society

 
Kansas counties
1867 establishments in Kansas
Populated places established in 1867